Naudiha Bazar is a small town in the Indian state of Jharkhand. It is the headquarters of Palamu division and Palamu district, and subdivision Chhatarpur (Jharkhand Assembly constituency) and block of the Naudiha Bazar block.

Geography

Culture

Major Hindu and Muslim festivals are celebrated in Naudiha Bazar. Hindus and Muslims celebrate muharram, chhath and durga puja together.

Temples

shiv Mandir is a temple situated in the center of Naudiha Bazar main market. Many people come here to worship Shiva on all day.

See also
 Palamu Loksabha constituency
 Jharkhand Legislative Assembly
 Jharkhand
 Palamu

References

External links
 

Cities and towns in Palamu district